Spring City is a town in the Abaco Islands, Bahamas. It is almost directly south of Marsh Harbour. It is also a part of the Marsh Harbour-Spring City Township. It is located 4 meters above sea-level, making it prone to global warming. As of 2010, its population was 500.

See also
Marsh Harbour
The Bahamas

References

Populated places in the Bahamas
Abaco Islands